"Every Girl in This Town" is a song written by Erik Dylan, Connie Harrington and Caitlyn Smith, and recorded by American country music artist Trisha Yearwood.  It was released in June 2019 as the lead single from her twelfth studio album, Every Girl, her first album of original music since 2007's Heaven, Heartache and the Power of Love.

Yearwood announced the Every Girl on Tour, her first solo tour in five years, in promotion of her new music.

Content
The song was written by Erik Dylan, Connie Harrington and Caitlyn Smith and has been described as a "scintillating, slow-building power ballad" with "a message of empowerment and solidarity to young girls and women everywhere." Yearwood referred to the song as emotional and inspiring, and said the lyrics reminded her of herself as "that little girl who believed anything and everything was possible" and that it serves a reminder to just be yourself.

Music video
The music video was directed by Blythe Thomas and premiered on June 28, 2019. In the video, Yearwood is seen performing the song against a set made up of baby blue wallpaper and a similarly colored blanket. She is shown with women of all ages embracing their inner beauty, while other home video footage of women celebrating is also seen. It ends with Yearwood and all the women throwing their hands up in the air in celebration and rejoice.

Chart performance
"Every Girl in This Town" debuted at number 21 on the Billboard Country Airplay chart dated June 15, 2019, marking the highest chart debut of her career, surpassing the number 36 start for "Love Will Always Win" in 2006. It also makes it her first top 40 hit since "This Is Me You're Talking To" in 2008.

References

2019 singles
Trisha Yearwood songs
2019 songs
Country ballads
Songs written by Connie Harrington
Song recordings produced by Garth Fundis
Songs written by Caitlyn Smith